Boone Lake is a reservoir in Sullivan and Washington counties in northeastern Tennessee, formed by the impoundment of the South Fork Holston River and Watauga River behind Boone Dam.
 
The dam and reservoir are maintained and operated by the Tennessee Valley Authority (TVA).

Boone Lake may house one of the smaller lakes that the state has to offer, but the lakefront real estate packs a southern punch - with the average cost of shorefront property sitting at a cool $1.37 million according to a 2020 study. This places Boone Lake as the sixteenth most expensive lake shorefront property in the United States. At the time of the study, the dam repair was still underway; greatly reducing the accessibility, aesthetics and shoreline of the lake.

Recreational facilities on the lake include a swimming area and a boat ramp. Water skiing and fishing are popular activities on the lake. Fish species in the lake of interest to sport fishermen include brown trout, lake trout, rainbow trout, largemouth bass, smallmouth bass, and striped bass. There are precautionary fish consumption advisories for catfish and carp due to PCB and chlordane concentrations. Children and women who are pregnant or breastfeeding are advised not to consume these two species, and other persons are advised to limit their consumption to one meal per month.

References

Holston River
Watauga River
Tennessee Valley Authority
Reservoirs in Tennessee
Protected areas of Sullivan County, Tennessee
Protected areas of Washington County, Tennessee
Bodies of water of Sullivan County, Tennessee
Bodies of water of Washington County, Tennessee